Wutah kobby is the stage name of Daniel  Nyarko Morris , a Ghanaian singer and songwriter from Eastern Region of Ghana and also CEO of Wutah Kobby Music.

Life and music career
Christened Daniel Morris Nyarko 21 December 1982 and known in the showbiz cycles as Wutah Kobby, he hails from Kwahu-Obomeng in the Eastern Region of the Republic of Ghana.

Bred in the capital city Accra, he had his secondary education at Koforidua Senior High Technical School and later to the Takoradi Polytechnic where he was awarded HND in Building Engineering.

Wutah Kobby's teamed up with two others to form the group, to contest in the maiden Nescafe African Revelation which they come out 2nd, Currently with three albums "Anamontuo", "Burning Desire" and "Selfless Bliss" to his credit, the ace singer shares the two former albums with Peevee.

Also, he is currently the vice president of the Ghana Association of Songwriters.

Discography
Studio albums
 Anamontuo (2004) 
 Burning Desire (2008)
 Selfless Bliss (2015) – Solo Project
Abokobi Album (2021)

Anamontuo (meaning Exodus) – the maiden album was released in 2004 and produced hit songs like "Goosy-gander", "Adonko", "Big dreams" and many hit songs.

Burning Desire – the second album as a duo was released in late 2008 and also had the hit song "Kotosa".

Selfless Bliss – the maiden album by Wutah Kobby as a solo artiste was released in and produced hits like "Tsotsoo", "Ambulance", and "Odo Yewu" with the latter two featuring Sarkodie and Kwabena Kwabena respectively.

Abokobi Album - This Album features artist like Medikal, Guru, KelvynBoy, Fameye, Comedian Waris, Angla Escoba, Kwesi Swat etc. Abokobi is a 18 track album which consist of musics like Mattress, So Far So Good, Boosue, Ade dede , Gold , kokoti, Set You free, Odo Colour, etc.

Awards and nominations

Bass Awards 

|-
|rowspan="5"|2015
|rowspan="5"|Himself
|-
|Song Writer of the Year
|
|-
|Best Reggae Video of the Year
|
|-
|Best Male Vocalist of the Year
|
|-
|Reggae Song of the Year
|
|-

Ghana Music Awards UK

|-
|rowspan="4"|2018
|rowspan="4"|Himself
|-
|High Life Song of the Year
|
|-
|Best Group of the Year
|
|-
|High Life Song of the Year
|
|-

Vodafone-Ghana Music Awards

|-
|rowspan="2"|2006
|rowspan="5"|Himself
|Record of the Year 
|
|-
|Best reggae song of the year
|
|-
|rowspan="2"|2010
|Best High Life Song of the Year
|
|-
|Best Reggae Song of the Year
|
|-
|2018
|Best Group of the Year
|
|-

Ghana Music Awards USA

|-
| style="text-align:centre,"|2018
|Himself
|Best Group of the Year
|

References

External links 
 
 

1982 births
Living people
People from Accra
Koforidua Senior High Technical School alumni